Tokhmaqlu (also Romanized as Tokhmāqlū; also known as Tokhmāghlū and Tukhm Āqlu) is a village in Karchambu-e Shomali Rural District, in the Central District of Buin va Miandasht County, Isfahan Province, Iran. At the 2006 census, its population was 533, in 129 families.

References 

Populated places in Buin va Miandasht County